MLPA can stand for:
 Marine Life Protection Act
 a Multilateral Peering Agreement governing the exchange of traffic between Internet networks
 Multiplex Ligation-dependent Probe Amplification
 Morningside/Lenox Park Association